Fric-Frac is a 1939 French comedy film directed by Maurice Lehmann and Claude Autant-Lara, starring Fernandel, Arletty and Michel Simon. It tells the story of Marcel, an assistant to a jeweller, who befriends a couple of criminals who want to use him as an accomplice to rob his boss. The film is based on a 1936 play by Édouard Bourdet. Filming took place in March and April 1939 at the Laboratoires et Studios Eclair in Épinay-sur-Seine. The film was released in France on 15 June 1939.

Cast
 Fernandel as Marcel
 Arletty as Loulou
 Michel Simon as Jo
 Hélène Robert as Renée
 Marcel Vallée as Mercadier, the jeweller
 Jacques Varennes as Tintin
 Andrex as Petit Louis
 René Génin as Blin
 Georges Lannes as Fernand
 Génia Vaury as La Grande Marie

Production
According to Arletty, Claude Autant-Lara did all the direction and Maurice Lehmann was mainly the producer.

References

1939 comedy films
1939 films
French films based on plays
Films directed by Claude Autant-Lara
French comedy films
1930s French-language films
French black-and-white films
Films scored by Casimir Oberfeld
1930s French films